The twenty-ninth season of Saturday Night Live, an American sketch comedy series, originally aired in the United States on NBC between October 4, 2003, and May 15, 2004.

History

This season marked the debut of a brand new stage for the host's monologue and the musical guest performing stage. Instead of the wrought-iron fire escape motif with the blinking "ON AIR" light, the stages are now modeled after Grand Central Terminal (right down to the spherical clock).

Cast
Before the start of the season, longtime cast members Chris Kattan and Tracy Morgan, who had both been on the show since 1996, and Dean Edwards, who had been a featured player since 2001, all left the show. Despite Kattan and Morgan's departures, the two would make guest appearances in several episodes throughout the season and Morgan would later host in 2009 and 2015.

Before the season started, Will Forte, Seth Meyers, and Jeff Richards were all promoted to repertory status, while Fred Armisen remained a featured player. 

The show added two new African-American cast members: stand-up comedian Finesse Mitchell and Kenan Thompson, a former child star from the Nickelodeon comedy shows All That and Kenan & Kel. Thompson became the first SNL cast member to be born after the show's premiere in 1975 (Thompson was born in 1978). Thompson eventually became the longest-tenured cast member in the show’s history.

This was the final season for both Jeff Richards (who quit mid-season, wanting to pursue other projects) and Jimmy Fallon (who decided to leave the show after the final episode).

Cast

Repertory players
Rachel Dratch
Jimmy Fallon
Tina Fey
Will Forte
Darrell Hammond
Seth Meyers
Chris Parnell
Amy Poehler
Jeff Richards (final episode: January 17, 2004)
Maya Rudolph
Horatio Sanz

Featured players
Fred Armisen
Finesse Mitchell
Kenan Thompson
bold denotes "Weekend Update" anchor

Writers

Future cast member Jason Sudeikis is hired as a writer this season.

Episodes

Specials

References

29
Saturday Night Live in the 2000s
2003 American television seasons
2004 American television seasons
Television shows directed by Beth McCarthy-Miller